The Ministry of Science and Innovation (MICINN) is the department of the Government of Spain responsible for developing and implementing the government policy on scientific research, technological development and innovation in all sectors. In particular, MICINN is responsible for the exercise of research, technological development and innovation competencies in space matters, including representation and participation in European Union and International organizations.

MICINN is headed by the Minister of Science, who is appointed by the King of Spain at request of the Prime Minister. The Minister is assisted by three main officials, the Secretary-General for Research, the Secretary-General for Innovation and the Ministry's Under Secretary. The current Minister is Diana Morant.

The first predecessor of this ministry was established during the regency of Maria Christina of Austria with the creation of the Ministry of Public Instruction and Fine Arts, formed by Royal Decree of the April 18, 1900. The first minister was Antonio García Alix. This ministry included an area for the "promotion of science".

History

Origins 
At the very beginning, like many of the current ministries, the Ministry of Science responsibilities were integrated in the Ministry of Development when it was created in 1832.

The first attempt of separating the responsibilities on education and science from the Development Ministry happened in 1886. This year, in order to give more autonomy to the education matters it was passed the Royal Decree of May 7, 1886, which divided the mentioned ministry into two ministries: Ministry of Public Instruction and Sciences, Letters and Fine Arts —with competencies on public and private education, education staff, inspection and promotion of knowledge, promotion of sciences, promotion of writing and fine arts, archives, libraries and museums, the economic and infrastructure issues on these matters, astronomy, statistics, meteorology and metrology, astronomical observatories, population movements and censuses— and the Ministry of Public Works, Agriculture, Industry and Trade —with competences over public investments in infrastructure and transport, agriculture, fishing, food, industry and commerce—. However, this royal decree that divided the Development Ministry into two ministries did not come to pass, as the necessary credits were not approved by the Cortes.

Ministry of Public Instruction 
Fourteen years later and inspired by the decree of 1886, the Budget Act of 1900 approved the necessary credit to split the Ministry of Development into two new ministries, and the science responsibilities were transferred to the new Ministry of Public Instruction and Fine Arts which assumed the competencies provided for in the decree of 1886.

In 1907, the Count of Gimeno, Minister of Education, created the Board for the Extension of Studies and Scientific Research (JAE). This new institution was heir to the principles of the Institución Libre de Enseñanza, and with it was intended to end Spanish isolation and link with European science and culture, as well as prepare the personnel in charge of carrying out the necessary reforms in the areas of science, culture and education. In this way, the effort to reform, to regenerate the country, became a national enterprise, independent of the political swings, in which intellectuals of different ideology were involved.

The JAE created dozens of laboratories, research centers and gave hundreds of scholarships for research abroad as well as connecting intellectuals from Spain and the rest of Europe. Since its inception was chaired by the Medicine Nobel Prize winner Santiago Ramón y Cajal.

Dictatorship and CSIC 
During the Civil War, Franco created the Technical Board of the State (1936–38) to rule the country and the science responsibilities were assumed by the Commission of Culture and Education. With the Civil War over and the Ministry of Education restored, the science responsibilities were maintained in the Education Ministry. In 1939 it was created the Spanish National Research Council (CSIC) which assumed the research centers and laboratories from the Board for the Extension of Studies and Scientific Research, from the Foundation for Scientific Research and Reform Studies and from the Institute of Spain. Minister José Ibáñez Martín was its first President.

Without permanent staff, the first years of the CSIC was limited to consultative responsibilities to the Government, but in 1945 it was approved the first permanent scientific positions, limited to technical research and agriculture.

The last years of the dictatorship were the most relevant to science. In 1966, the Ministry of National Education was renamed Ministry of Education and Science being this one the first time that the word "science" appeared in a Ministry and remained like that until 1979 when for the first time the responsibilities on universities and research got their own ministry named Ministry of Universities and Research.

Democracy 
This new ministry assumed the functions of the Secretary of State for Universities and Research that had been created in 1977 within the Ministry of Education and Science, and other administrative bodies of scientific competence, as well as some bodies dependent on the Office of the Prime Minister. In 1980 the National Museum of Science and Technology was created and in 1986 the Carlos III Health Institute and the Center for Energy, Environmental and Technological Research.

Without reaching two years of life, the Ministry was merged again with the Education Ministry and, with different denominations, remained so until in 2000, when the Premier José María Aznar, created the Ministry of Science and Technology that grouped the competences on scientific research of the Ministry of Education, and the competences on technological development of the Ministry of Industry and Energy, including telecommunications; retaining the Ministry of Education, Culture and Sport the universities responsibilities.

After four years without much success, the ministry was reinstated in the Education Ministry by Prime Minister José Luis Rodríguez Zapatero who recovered the old name of Ministry of Education and Science. However, in his second term Zapatero again granted ministerial rank to scientific competencies with the Ministry of Science and Innovation in order to depend less "on the construction and more outstanding services of knowledge, invest more in science and technology, help to companies to innovate and coordinate universities and research centers». However, the dependence on construction did not stop and with the outbreak of the property bubble and the subsequent economic crisis made the following government, led by Mariano Rajoy, in an effort to reduce public spending, reduced the size of the Administration merging the Ministry of Science and Innovation with the Ministry of Economy. During the premiership of Rajoy, the State Research Agency was created.

Already with a better economic situation, the new government of Pedro Sánchez recovered the Department of Science including not only the scientific and innovation competencies, but also recovering for this Ministry the responsibilities on universities that the Ministry already had under the premiership of Adolfo Suarez, naming as Science Minister astronaut Pedro Duque.

In 2020, the department lost its power over universities due to the re-creation of the Department of Universities.

Organization chart 
The Department of Science and Innovation is structured in the following bodies:

 The General Secretariat for Research 
 The Directorate-General for Research Planning
The Technical Cabinet
The Deputy Directorate-General for Coordination of Public Research Organizations
 The General Secretariat for Innovation
The Technical Cabinet
The Deputy Directorate-General for Innovation Promotion
The Deputy Directorate-General for Innovation Coordination
 The Undersecretariat of Science and Innovation
 The Technical General Secretariat
The Technical Cabinet
The Budget Office
The Deputy Directorate-General for Economic Management
The Administrative Office
The Deputy Directorate-General for Personnel and Inspection of Services
The IT Division
The Commissioner for Aerospace 'PERTE'.
The Space Technical Office.
The Special Delegation for the Spanish Space Agency.

List of officeholders
Office name:
Ministry of Universities and Research (1979–1981)
Ministry of Science and Technology (2000–2004)
Ministry of Science and Innovation (2008–2011; 2020–present)
Ministry of Science, Innovation and Universities (2018–2020)

See also
Instituto Nacional de Técnica Aeroespacial
Spanish National Research Council

Notes

Notes and references
Official website of Ministry of Science

External links
Official website 

1900 establishments in Spain
 
Education
Spain, Education
Education
Calle de Alcalá
Research in Spain
Members of the International Science Council
Science and technology ministries